Siah Dasht may refer to:
 Siah Dasht-e Olya, Mazandaran Province
 Siah Dasht-e Sofla, Mazandaran Province
 Siah Dasht, North Khorasan